Arakan Campaign may refer to:

 Arakan campaign (February–April 1825), in the First Anglo-Burmese War
 Second World War:
 Arakan Campaign 1942–43
 Arakan Campaign 1943-1944
 Arakan Campaign 1944-1945